The Old Bushmills Distillery is an alcohol (primarily Irish whiskey) distillery in Bushmills, County Antrim, Northern Ireland, owned by Proximo Spirits.  Bushmills Distillery uses water drawn from Saint Columb's Rill, which is a tributary of the River Bush. The distillery is a popular tourist attraction, with around 120,000 visitors per year.

The company that originally built the distillery was formed in 1784, although the date 1608 is printed on the label of the brand – referring to an earlier date when a royal licence was granted to a local landowner to distil whiskey in the area. After various periods of closure in its subsequent history, the distillery has been in approximately continuous operation since it was rebuilt after a fire in 1885.

History

The area has a long tradition with distillation.  According to one story, as far back as 1276, an early settler called Sir Robert Savage of Ards, before defeating the Irish in battle, fortified his troops with "a mighty drop of acqua vitae". In 1608, a licence was granted to Sir Thomas Phillips by King James I to distil whiskey.

for the next seven years, within the countie of Colrane, otherwise called O Cahanes countrey, or within the territorie called Rowte, in Co. Antrim, by himselfe or his servauntes, to make, drawe, and distil such and soe great quantities of aquavite, usquabagh and aqua composita, as he or his assignes shall thinke fitt; and the same to sell, vent, and dispose of to any persons, yeeldinge yerelie the somme 13s 4d ...

The Bushmills Old Distillery Company itself was not established until 1784 by Hugh Anderson. Bushmills suffered many lean years with numerous periods of closure with no record of the distillery being in operation in the official records both in 1802 and in 1822. In 1860 a Belfast spirit merchant named Jame McColgan and Patrick Corrigan bought the distillery; in 1880 they formed a limited company.  In 1885, the original Bushmills buildings were destroyed by fire but the distillery was swiftly rebuilt.  In 1890, a steamship owned and operated by the distillery, SS Bushmills, made its maiden voyage across the Atlantic to deliver Bushmills whiskey to America. It called at Philadelphia and New York City before heading on to Singapore, Hong Kong, Shanghai and Yokohama.

In the early 20th century, the U.S. was a very important market for Bushmills (and other Irish Whiskey producers). American Prohibition in 1920 came as a large blow to the Irish Whiskey industry, but Bushmills managed to survive. Wilson Boyd, Bushmills' director at the time, predicted the end of prohibition and had large stores of whiskey ready to export. After the Second World War, the distillery was bought by Isaac Wolfson, and, in 1972, it was taken over by Irish Distillers, meaning that Irish Distillers controlled the production of all Irish whiskey at the time. In June 1988, Irish Distillers was bought by French liquor group Pernod Ricard.

In June 2005, the distillery was bought by Diageo for £200 million. Diageo have also announced a large advertising campaign in order to regain a market share for Bushmills.

In May 2008, the Bank of Ireland issued a new series of sterling banknotes in Northern Ireland which all feature an illustration of the Old Bushmills Distillery on the obverse side, replacing the previous notes series which depicted Queen's University of Belfast.

In November 2014 it was announced that Diageo had traded the Bushmills brand with the Beckmann family of Mexico in exchange for the 50% of the Don Julio brand of tequila that Diageo did not already own.

Current whiskey range

 Bushmills Original – Irish whiskey blend sometimes called White Bush or Bushmills White Label. The grain whiskey is matured in American oak casks.
 Black Bush – A blend with a significantly greater proportion of malt whiskey than the white label. It features malt whiskey aged in casks previously used for Spanish Oloroso sherry.
 Red Bush – Like the Black Bush, this is a blend with a higher proportion of malt whiskey than the standard bottling, but in contrast the malt whiskey has been matured in ex-bourbon casks.
 Bushmills 10 year single malt – Combines malt whiskeys aged at least 10 years in American bourbon or Oloroso sherry casks.
 Bushmills Distillery Reserve 12 year single malt – exclusively available at the Old Bushmills Distillery, this 12 year aged single malt is matured in oak casks for a rich, complex flavour with notes of sherry, dark chocolate and spices.
 Bushmills 16 year single malt – Malt whiskeys aged at least 16 years in American bourbon barrels or Spanish Oloroso sherry butts are mixed together before finishing in Port pipes for a few months.
 Bushmills 21 year single malt – A limited number of 21 year bottles are made each year. After 19 years, bourbon-barrel-aged and sherry-cask-aged malt whiskeys are combined, which is followed by two years of finishing in Madeira drums.
 Bushmills 1608: Originally released as a special 400th Anniversary whiskey; since 2009 it will be available only in the Whiskey Shop at the distillery and at duty-free shops.

Critical acclaim
Some Bushmills offerings have performed well at international Spirit ratings competitions.  In particular, its Black Bush Finest Blended Whiskey received double gold medals at the 2007 and 2010 San Francisco World Spirits Competitions. It also received a well-above-average score of 93 from the Beverage Testing Institute in 2008 and 2011.

In popular culture

 Before attaining relative sobriety in the early 2000s, Ministry frontman Al Jourgensen was a heavy drinker of Bushmills, consuming as much as two full bottles per day.
 The band NOFX mentions Bushmills in the song "Theme from a NOFX Album" on the 2000 release Pump Up the Valuum.
 Tom Waits mentions 'Old Bushmills' in the song "Tom Traubert's Blues" (which was also covered by Rod Stewart).
 In the third-season episode of The Wire, Back Burners, Jimmy McNulty refers to Bushmills as "Protestant whiskey" when he is offered it after being told Jameson is unavailable.
 Burt Reynolds plays a police lieutenant in the 1975 film Hustle whose favourite drink is Bushmills.
 Todd Rundgren cites "a half a pint of Bushmills" as a poor substitute for love in his song "Hungry for Love" from the 1973 album A Wizard, a True Star.
 Paul Freeman's character Colin orders two Bushmills at a Belfast pub in the 1980 film The Long Good Friday.
 In the 1982 film The Verdict, the Paul Newman character Frank Galvin orders Bushmills and water at his neighbourhood pub.
 In Rescue Me the series, seasons 1–7, Bushmills is the common whiskey shared and favorited among the entire Irish Gavin Family and referred to in at least ten episodes.
 In Jackie Brown, a bottle of Bushmills is visible in scenes in Max's office and is referenced in the script.
 In Independence Day, Jeff Goldblum's character is seen drinking a bottle of Bushmills, lamenting the end of the world.
In Better Call Saul Season 4, Episode 6 "Piñata", Howard suggests to Chuck McGill to join him in his office, where a Mr. Bushmills is waiting for him - an apparently workplace correct reference to celebrate a recent lawsuit win in a difficult case by Chuck for the law firm.
 In The Eagle Has Landed, the character of Liam Devlin expresses a fondness for Bushmills whiskey.

See also
 
 List of historic whiskey distilleries
 Cask
 Distillation
 Master blender

References

Notes

Bibliography

External links
Bushmills Official site

Buildings and structures in County Antrim
Cuisine of Northern Ireland
Distilled drinks from Northern Ireland
Food and drink companies of Northern Ireland
Grade B1 listed buildings
Tourist attractions in County Antrim
Companies established in 1784
Distilleries in Northern Ireland
Brands of Northern Ireland
Food and drink companies established in 1784